The Organization was an American heavy metal band, formed in 1991 after the breakup of thrash metal band Death Angel. They made an appearance at the Dynamo Open Air festival in 1992. The band incorporated elements of metal, funk, and alt rock, and they released two albums in the early 1990s on their own label, Unsafe Unsane Recordings, which was distributed through Metal Blade Records.  The band included the original line-up of musicians from Death Angel minus singer Mark Osegueda, who left the music business to go to college. The Organization disbanded after bassist Dennis Pepa left the band in 1995.

Discography

Demos
Home Job (1992)

Albums
The Organization [Unsafe Unsane Recordings - license / Metal Blade Records - distribution] (1993)
Savor the Flavor [Unsafe Unsane Recordings - license / Metal Blade Records - distribution] (1995)

References

External links
Biography at Encyclopaedia Metallum

Heavy metal musical groups from California
Musical groups established in 1991
Musical groups disestablished in 1995
1991 establishments in California